Qudus Abolaji Wahab (born 30 January 2000) is a Nigerian college basketball player for the Georgetown Hoyas of the Big East Conference. He has also played for Maryland.

Early life and high school career
Wahab was raised in Lagos, Nigeria, spending the first 15 years of his life there before moving to the United States. He spent his freshman and sophomore years of high school at the Virginia Academy before transferring to the Flint Hill School for the rest of his high school career.

Recruiting
Wahab committed to Georgetown under head coach Patrick Ewing on January 30, 2019, his 19th birthday, over UConn, Pittsburgh, and Syracuse.

College career

Georgetown (first stint)
Wahab played in 32 games, starting 7, and averaged 5.5 points and 14.7 minutes per game, along with 30 blocks. He recorded a double-double against Creighton on March 4, 2020, scoring 14 points and 12 rebounds.

Wahab broke out during his sophomore season, starting 25 games and averaging 12.7 points, 27.7 minutes, and 1.6 blocks per game. He averaged 14.3 points and 8.3 rebounds during the 2021 Big East men's basketball tournament, where Georgetown won the tournament and advanced to the 2021 NCAA tournament. He scored a careerhigh 20 points in Georgetown's first round loss against Colorado. Following the 2020–21 season, he elected to transfer from Georgetown.

Maryland
On April 3, 2021, Wahab transferred to Maryland to play under head coach Mark Turgeon. In his only season there, he averaged 7.7 points and 5.6 rebounds per game in 31 starts.

Georgetown (second stint)

Wahab decided to return to Georgetown after the 2021–22 season, possibly due to a coaching change at Maryland.

Career statistics

College

|-
| style="text-align:left;"| 2019–20
| style="text-align:left;"| Georgetown
| 32 || 7 || 14.7 || .583 || – || .632 || 4.3 || .3 || .3 || .9 || 5.5
|-
| style="text-align:left;"| 2020–21
| style="text-align:left;"| Georgetown
| 26 || 25 || 27.7 || .591 || – || .673 || 8.2 || .2 || .4 || 1.6 || 12.7
|- class="sortbottom"
| style="text-align:center;" colspan="2"| Career
| 58 || 32 || 20.5 || .588 || – || .659 || 6.1 || .3 || .3 || 1.2 || 8.7

References

External links
Maryland Terrapins bio
Georgetown Hoyas bio

2000 births
Living people
Centers (basketball)
Georgetown Hoyas men's basketball players
Maryland Terrapins men's basketball players
Nigerian expatriate basketball people in the United States
Nigerian men's basketball players
Sportspeople from Lagos